Kunzea pauciflora, the Mount Melville kunzea, is a species of flowering plant in the myrtle family Myrtaceae, and is endemic to a small area on the south coast of Western Australia. It is a shrub with the stems densely branched near their ends, linear leaves and one, two or three pink flowers near the ends of the branches but usually only at the top of the shrub.

Description
The flowers appear singly, in pairs or groups of three to five on the ends of long shoots or branches. Flowering occurs between August and November and the fruit is an urn-shaped capsule with the erect sepals attached.

Taxonomy and naming
Kunzea pauciflora was first formally described in 1844 by Johannes Conrad Schauer and published in Johann Georg Christian Lehmann's book Plantae Preissianae from a specimen collected near Cape Riche. The specific epithet (pauciflora) is derived from the Latin words paucus meaning "few" or "little" and flos meaning "flower" or "blossom".

Distribution and habitat
Mount Melville kunzea is found on hillside and slopes near the coast around Cape Riche in the Fitzgerald River National Park, where it grows in gravelly sandy or loamy soils over limestone or sandstone.

Conservation status
Kunzea pauciflora is classified as "Priority Four" by the Government of Western Australia Department of Parks and Wildlife, meaning that it is rare or near threatened.

References

pauciflora
Endemic flora of Western Australia
Myrtales of Australia
Rosids of Western Australia
Vulnerable flora of Australia
Plants described in 1844